FFCC may refer to:

 Final Fantasy Crystal Chronicles, a video game series 
 Florida Film Critics Circle, an organization of film reviewers
 Flowery Field Cricket Club, an English cricket club
 Full Faith and Credit Clause, part of the United States Constitution
 Florida Federation of Colorguards Circuit, a circuit of Florida indoor winds, indoor drumline, and colorguard